Obsidian is a type of volcanic glass.

Obsidian may also refer to:

Places
Obsidian, Idaho, a town in Custer County, Idaho
Obsidian Ridge, a mountain ridge in British Columbia, Canada

Arts, entertainment, and media

Fictional entities
Obsidian (comics), a DC Comics character
Obsidian (Transformers), a Transformers character
Obsidian, a character in the animated TV series Trollz
Obsidian, a character in the Cartoon Network series Steven Universe
 Obsidian, a synonym for dragonglass, which kills White Walkers and their soldiers in Game of Thrones
Obsidian Order, the fictional Cardassian intelligence agency from Star Trek

Gaming
Obsidian (1986 video game), a video game written for the Amstrad CPC
Obsidian (1997 video game), an adventure game developed by Rocket Science Games
Obsidian Entertainment, a video game developer

Literature
 Obsidian (novel), a 2020 novel by Thomas King
 Obsidian: Literature and Arts in the African Diaspora, an African-American peer-reviewed journal first published in 1975

Music
Obsidian (Baths album), 2013
Obsidian (Northlane album), 2022
Obsidian (Paradise Lost album), 2020
"Obsidian", a song by Banco de Gaia from Igizeh, 2000
"Obsidian", a song by Deadmau5 from Stuff I Used to Do, 2017
"Obsidian", a song by Meshuggah from Nothing, 2002

Technology 
 Obsidian (software), a note-taking application